Larsenaikia jardinei is a shrub or small tree in the coffee family Rubiaceae, endemic to Central Eastern Queensland in Australia.

References

Endemic flora of Queensland
Gardenieae
Plants described in 1993